Manjoceras is a genus of discosorids named by Zhuravleva, 1972; a kind of nautiloid in which the connecting rings of the siphuncle are longitudinally zoned and clasp around the rim of the septal openings.

References

 Manjoceras, Fossilworks entry.
 Curt Teichert, 1964, Nautiloidea-Discosorids. Treatise on Invertebrate Paleontology, Part K. Geological Society of America.

Prehistoric nautiloid genera
Discosorida